Dmitry Knyazhevich (21 June 1874 – 1918) was an Imperial Russian soldier and Olympic fencer. He competed in the individual foil and team épée events at the 1912 Summer Olympics.

He was a member of the Knyazhevich family, which was a Russian family of Serbian origin that included his grandfather Dmitry, a notable writer, and great-uncle Alexander, who served as Minister of Finance under Alexander II.

He served in the Russo-Japanese War and later World War I, during which he was promoted to Major General. In 1918 during the Russian Civil War, he was killed in battle against the Bolsheviks.

References

External links
 

1874 births
1918 deaths
Male fencers from the Russian Empire
Olympic competitors for the Russian Empire
Fencers at the 1912 Summer Olympics
Military personnel of the Russian Empire killed in action